Ariel Julio Eslava Steinmetz is an Argentine basketball player. He was born in Buenos Aires and his birthdate is April 11, 1979. He is 2.04 m (6'8") in height and 98 kg (215 pounds) in weight. He currently plays for Saski Baskonia and previously played for Real Madrid Baloncesto, Boca Juniors, CB Cáceres and Melilla Baloncesto in the LEB. He has not played for the Argentina national basketball team but for the regional team. He holds dual Argentine and Spanish passports. He won the Spanish championship with Real Madrid in 2000 and the Spanish King's Cup in 2009 with TAU Cerámica.

References

External links
Euroleague.net Profile
Liga ACB profile
Profile at Eurobasket.com

1979 births
Living people
Argentine expatriate basketball people in Spain
Argentine men's basketball players
Basketball players from Buenos Aires
Boca Juniors basketball players
Club San Martín de Corrientes basketball players
Estudiantes de Bahía Blanca basketball players
Lanús basketball players
Liga ACB players
Melilla Baloncesto players
Real Madrid Baloncesto players
Regatas Corrientes basketball players
Saski Baskonia players